Dar Asiab (also Romanized as Dar Āsīāb; also known as Do Āsīāb) is a village in Estarabad-e Jonubi Rural District, in the Central District of Gorgan County, Golestan Province, Iran. At the 2006 census, its population was 214 in 78 families.

References 

Populated places in Gorgan County